Marychnów  is a village within the administrative district of Gmina Staroźreby, inside of Płock County, Masovian Voivodeship, in east-central Poland.

References

Villages in Płock County